The Pine Creek Rail Trail is a rail trail in the Appalachian Mountains of north-central Pennsylvania.

The trail begins just north of Wellsboro, runs south through Pine Creek Gorge (also known as the Grand Canyon of Pennsylvania) and ends at Jersey Shore. A 2001 article in USA Today named the  trail one of the "10 great places to take a bike tour" in the world.

Route

The trail is located wholly within Tioga and Lycoming Counties. The trail carries a section of BicyclePA Route G.

The trail parallels Route 6 in a southwesterly direction for about  until it reaches the village of Ansonia. South of Ansonia, the trail parallels Pine Creek as it goes south along the floor of Pine Creek Gorge. It passes through Leonard Harrison State Park and the Tioga State Forest. The section between Ansonia and Blackwell is very remote, and much of the trail is inaccessible by road.

South of Blackwell, the trail enters Lycoming County and the Tiadaghton State Forest. Pennsylvania Route 414 ends near the unincorporated village of Waterville. South of Waterville, the trail parallels Pennsylvania Route 44 for approximately  until the trail reaches its southern terminus in Jersey Shore. (Parking at Railroad St. and Humes St.) Between Blackwell and Jersey Shore, the trail crosses the highway and Pine Creek several times, and it is almost always within sight of both the road and the creek.

Boroughs, villages, and attractions located along or near the trail (from north to south):
 Asaph
 Ansonia
 Leonard Harrison State Park
 Colton Point State Park is located on the western side of Pine Creek, but no public bridges span the creek between Ansonia and Blackwell.
 Tioga State Forest
 Tiadaghton
 Blackwell (Morris Township)
 Tiadaghton State Forest
 Cedar Run (Brown Township)
 Slate Run (Brown Township)
 Cammal (McHenry Township)
 Jersey Mills (McHenry Township)
 Waterville (Cummings Township)
 Watson Township
 Porter Township
 Jersey Shore

History

The Native American Pine Creek Path followed Pine Creek from Jersey Shore to Ansonia and beyond. The earliest industry in the region was logging. In the years between 1820 and 1883, trees were floated down the creek to sawmills in Jersey Shore and Williamsport. In 1883, the Jersey Shore, Pine Creek and Buffalo Railway opened. Sawmills were constructed in several communities along the creek, and finished products were carried out by train. Coal mining was another important industry, and coal was also shipped along the railroad.

After a series of reorganizations, the railroad along Pine Creek became a part of the New York Central Railroad and eventually Conrail. Freight and passenger service continued until 1988, when Conrail ended rail service. The tracks were removed, and the first section of the Pine Creek Rail Trail opened in 1996. The trail opened in stages with the most recent section (from Ansonia to just north of Wellsboro) being completed in 2007. The trail is operated by the Pennsylvania Department of Conservation and Natural Resources.

In 2001, an article in the USA Today newspaper named the Pine Creek Rail Trail one of "10 great places to take a bike tour" in the world. It was one of only five places in the continental United States on the list, which was compiled by Patricia Vance, author of bicycle touring guides. The article cited the "Grand Canyon of Pennsylvania" as "idyllic in fall" and mentioned the "gorge with views of the cliffs and mixed hardwood forest".

During the Great Depression, the Civilian Conservation Corps built numerous roads, bridges, and trails through the area. Evidence of their work is still visible and is commemorated with a sign near the Darling Run trail access area.

Activities

The trail is relatively flat with only gentle grades. It is topped with crushed limestone. The trail is used for bicycling and hiking during the spring, summer and fall, and the trail is used for cross-country skiing during the winter. Between Ansonia and Tiadaghton, horseback riding is permitted on the trail.

The trail intersects with several hiking trails, including the Pennsylvania Mid State Trail. During some parts of the year, people can be found fishing, canoeing, and kayaking when the weather is warm. The water level in the creek varies significantly, and it is sometimes too shallow for boating.

Hawks and other large birds have been said to be seen by viewers along the trail, along with Canada geese, ducks, and occasionally bald eagles. Bears and white-tailed deer live in the wooded areas and are seen along the trail.

Without a written permit from the Pennsylvania Department of Conservation and Natural Resources, motorized vehicles are strictly forbidden from using the trail. This ban includes motorcycles, snowmobiles and all-terrain vehicles.

Camping is allowed only in certain areas such as Bonell Flats and Black Walnut Bottom along the trail, and permits for these locations must be obtained in advance from the Pennsylvania Department of Conservation and Natural Resources. Several private campgrounds are located near the trail. Numerous lodging establishments are available in Wellsboro and Jersey Shore. There are also small lodging establishments located in Blackwell and Cedar Run, and private cabin rentals are available along the trail.

Parking areas and composting toilets are available at regular intervals along the entire length of the trail. Several water pumps are provided along the trail, but trail users should carry enough water to last for the duration of their trips. The boroughs of Wellsboro and Jersey Shore offer a full array of services and supplies. Restaurants are located in Blackwell, Cedar Run, Slate Run, Waterville and Jersey Shore, while gasoline and other supplies are available at general stores located in Ansonia, Slate Run and Waterville.

Future expansion
The final section of the trail opened in 2007, and there are no immediate plans to expand the trail at this time. Several groups have proposed expanding the trail into the borough of Wellsboro or building a trail along the West Branch Susquehanna River between Jersey Shore and Williamsport.

See also
 List of rail trails in Pennsylvania

References

External links

PAcanyon.com - Mile by mile guide to the Pine Creek Rail Trail
Pine Creek Gorge
Leonard Harrison State Park
History of the Tioga State Forest
trail map with business list
Tioga County Visitors Bureau site (their trail map lacks business list)
Blackwell Hotel & Restaurant (located on the trail)
Cedar Run Inn (located on the trail)
RailsToTrails.us Pine Creek Trail Page

Rail trails in Pennsylvania
Protected areas of Tioga County, Pennsylvania
Protected areas of Lycoming County, Pennsylvania
1996 establishments in Pennsylvania